Jan Drusius can refer to:

Johannes van den Driesche (1550–1616), Flemish Protestant divine
Jan Druys (died 1635), Flemish Norbertine canon regular and Abbot of Park Abbey.